Korra is a village in Zhag'yab County, of the Chamdo Prefecture in the northeastern Tibet Autonomous Region of China. Korra in Tibetan refers to the act of Circumambulation.

References

Populated places in Chamdo